"I'll Be by Your Side" is the third single from the album Love & Emotion, released by Freestyle music singer Stevie B in 1991. Although it didn't achieve the same success as the previous single, "Because I Love You (The Postman Song)", the song peaked at No. 12 on the Billboard Hot 100 and reached the Top 40 in Canada, peaking at No. 38.

Track listings

Germany CD single

UK 12" single

France 7" single

Charts

References

1991 singles
Stevie B songs
1991 songs